David William Smigelsky (born July 3, 1959) is a former American football punter who played for the Atlanta Falcons of the National Football League (NFL) and Washington Federals of the United States Football League (USFL). He played college football at Virginia Tech.

References 

1959 births
Living people
North Hunterdon High School alumni
Sportspeople from Hunterdon County, New Jersey
Sportspeople from Perth Amboy, New Jersey
Players of American football from New Jersey
American football punters
Virginia Tech Hokies football players
Atlanta Falcons players
Washington Federals/Orlando Renegades players